Atlantic and Pacific may refer to:
Great Atlantic and Pacific Tea Company
Atlantic and Pacific Railroad
Atlantic and Pacific Highway
Atlantic and Pacific Telegraph Company
Atlantic Avenue – Barclays Center (New York City Subway) (formerly Atlantic Avenue – Pacific Street); subway station serving the  trains

See also
Pacific and Atlantic, the news agency